Brunellia racemifera is a species of plant in the Brunelliaceae family. It is endemic to Colombia.

References

racemifera
Vulnerable plants
Endemic flora of Colombia
Taxonomy articles created by Polbot
Taxa named by Edmond Tulasne